Chord Paul Overstreet (born February 17, 1989) is an American actor and musician. He is best known for his role as Sam Evans on the Fox television series Glee (2009–2015). He has starred in the Apple TV+ comedy series Acapulco since 2021.

After signing to Safehouse Records, he began a career as a solo musical artist. On August 26, 2016, he released his debut single, "Homeland", through Safehouse and Island Records.

Early life
Overstreet was born in Nashville, Tennessee to hairdresser Julie (née Miller) and country music singer-songwriter Paul Overstreet. He has an older brother, Nash Overstreet (born 1986), who plays guitar in the band Hot Chelle Rae; an older sister, Summer (born 1987), and three younger sisters, Harmony, Skye and Charity. He is of German, Irish and English descent. He was named after the musical term. He was raised on a farm outside of Nashville. Encouraged by his parents to pursue music, he started playing the mandolin at an early age, and moved on to the drums, flute, piano and guitar. He is also a songwriter. In his teenage years, he modeled for advertisements for Hollister, Famous Footwear and Gap. He was homeschooled.

Career

2009–2015: Beginnings and Glee
Overstreet began to pursue his passion of performing after his high school graduation in 2007. After two unsuccessful years, Overstreet started his acting career on the web series Private as Josh Hollis. He was also featured in an episode of iCarly titled "iSpeed Date" and starred in the unaired pilot of No Ordinary Family. His first film role was that of Teenage Boy in the 2009 thriller The Hole, and he starred in the 2011 film A Warrior's Heart as Dupree, alongside Ashley Greene and Kellan Lutz.

Overstreet played the character of Sam Evans, a transfer student and athlete, on the FOX comedy-drama television series Glee. He landed the role after auditioning with the Commodores' song "Easy" and Gavin DeGraw's "I Don't Want to Be". He later sang "Billionaire" by Travie McCoy featuring Bruno Mars as a studio test, and eventually sang this in his debut episode titled "Audition". His cover of "Billionaire" was released as a single and charted at #15 in Ireland, #24 in Canada, #28 in the United States, and #34 in Australia. On April 21, 2011, the video for Hot Chelle Rae's "Tonight Tonight" was released on YouTube and featured a series of cameos of Overstreet alternately making out with a girl (whom he stole from the lead singer) on an office copier, DJing at a club, then playing guitar and mugging for the crowd with his brother, Hot Chelle Rae band member, Nash.

On July 1, 2011, TVLine's Michael Ausiello broke the news that Overstreet's contract option to become a series regular on Glee had not been picked up for season 3, but that he could possibly come back as an occasional guest star. In reaction to the announcement, fans launched a campaign to promote Overstreet's cover of "Billionaire" and various tags related to the actor, most notably "#DontCutTheChord", began trending on Twitter. The song made its way into the iTunes top 5 Glee charts during the campaign.

At the 2011 Comic-Con event, Glee co-creator Brad Falchuk reported that they had offered Overstreet a ten-episode deal with a possibility to become a series regular at mid-season, but that Overstreet had declined the option. Overstreet later stated to Ausiello during an interview that he had decided to leave the show to focus on his music career, explaining: "They offered me the chance to come back for a few episodes, but there was nothing guaranteed so I decided to dive into the music thing." It was reported on October 18, 2011, and confirmed by series co-creator Ryan Murphy six days later, that Overstreet would be returning to Glee as a recurring character starting with the third season's eighth episode. On July 23, 2012, it was confirmed that Overstreet would be a series regular for the fourth season of Glee, where he continued until the last season.

2015–present: Music career, acting
Chord has cited James Taylor, David Gray, Jimmy Buffett, Bob Dylan, Paul Simon, and Hall & Oates as musicians that inspire him. On December 15, 2015, Overstreet signed a recording contract with Safehouse Records, a record label founded by Demi Lovato, Nick Jonas and Phil McIntyre. He was the first artist to be signed to the label. He opened for Lovato and Jonas on several tour dates of their Future Now Tour in summer 2016.

On August 26, 2016, Chord released his first official solo single, "Homeland", through Island Records and Safehouse Records. Digital Journal called it "a fitting homage to his hometown", giving the song a five star rating. A music video for the song premiered through Billboard on October 7, 2016. In a September 2016 interview with the Huffington Post, Overstreet revealed that he was working on an EP, yet to be released. In December 2016, he released a cover of "All I Want For Christmas is a Real Good Tan", written by Overstreet's father and originally recorded by Kenny Chesney. Overstreet released a new single, "Hold On", on February 3, 2017. The song peaked at number 31 on the Spotify Viral 50 chart and later earn double platinum certification by RIAA. He released his first EP consisting of four tracks on May 12, 2017, entitled Tree House Tapes.

In June 2017, he was picked as Elvis Duran's Artist of the Month and was featured on NBC's Today show broadcast nationally where he performed live his single "Hold On". He also performed the song on The Tonight Show Starring Jimmy Fallon on August 14, 2017.

Overstreet made appearances as a guest star in a number of television series including The Bold Type, Royalties, and Pickle and Peanut. In 2021, he joined the cast of Acapulco, an Apple TV+ comedy series set in 1984. The series' second season was released in October 2022.

In 2020, he starred in the comedy film The Swing of Things, which was released on Hulu. He starrred in the 2022 romantic comedy film Falling for Christmas opposite Lindsay Lohan.

Personal life 
Overstreet dated British actress Emma Watson in 2018.

Filmography

Film

Television

Music videos

Discography

As Chord Overstreet

Extended plays

Singles

As featured artist

As OVERSTREET

Extended plays

Singles

Tours
Co-headlining
 Glee Cast – Glee Live! In Concert! (2011)

Opening act
 Demi Lovato and Nick Jonas – Future Now Tour (2016) (selected dates)

Awards and nominations

References

External links

 Chord Overstreet at Island Records
 

1989 births
21st-century American male actors
21st-century American singers
American people of English descent
American people of German descent
American people of Irish descent
American male guitarists
American male film actors
American male singer-songwriters
American male television actors
American male voice actors
American mandolinists
American multi-instrumentalists
Guitarists from Tennessee
Island Records artists
Living people
Male actors from Nashville, Tennessee
Safehouse Records artists
Singer-songwriters from Tennessee
21st-century American guitarists
21st-century American male singers